Calatafimi was the name of at least two ships of the Italian Navy and may refer to:

 , a  launched in 1893 and sold for scrap in 1907
 , a  launched in 1923. Seized by Germany in 1943 being renamed TA19 and sunk in 1944

Italian Navy ship names